The 2021–22 EIHL season was the 18th season of the Elite Ice Hockey League. The regular season commenced on 25 September 2021, and finished on 17 April 2022, with the playoffs taking place over the following two weekends. The previous campaign in 2020–21 was suspended indefinitely in September 2020, due to the COVID-19 pandemic in the United Kingdom; a reduced Elite Series was held in April and May 2021, involving the Sheffield Steelers, the Nottingham Panthers, the Coventry Blaze and the Manchester Storm, to provide competitive ice time for players ahead of the 2021 IIHF World Championship.

The Belfast Giants won the regular season title for a record-equalling fifth time with two games to spare, following their 2–1 overtime win at their closest challengers, the Sheffield Steelers, on 10 April 2022. Having also won the Challenge Cup, the Belfast Giants as national league and cup champions had an opportunity to seal a Grand Slam in the playoff final by becoming British national champions for the third time, however they lost 6–3 to the Cardiff Devils – who thereby won their third consecutive playoff title and national championship, denying the table-topping Giants the Grand Slam for the second consecutive season.

Teams
The same ten teams that competed in the last regular season in 2019–20 are competing in the 2021–22 season.

Regular season

League standings
Each team played 54 games, playing each of the other nine teams six times: three times on home ice, and three times away from home. Points were awarded for each game, where two points were awarded for all victories, regardless of whether it was in regulation time or after overtime or game-winning shots. One point was awarded for losing in overtime or game-winning shots, and zero points for losing in regulation time. At the end of the regular season, the team that finished with the most points was crowned the league champion, and qualified for the 2022–23 Champions Hockey League. The top eight teams qualified for the playoffs.

Results

Statistics

Scoring leaders
The following players led the league in points, at the conclusion of the regular season.

Leading goaltenders
The following goaltenders led the league in goals against average, provided that they have played at least 40% of their team's minutes, at the conclusion of the regular season.

Playoffs

Bracket
In the two-legged quarter-finals, the highest-ranked team met the lowest-ranked team, the second-highest-ranked team met the second-lowest-ranked team and so forth. The winners of each tie was determined by aggregate scoring over the two games. In the semi-finals, the highest remaining seed was matched against the lowest remaining seed, with the other two teams facing off. The winners of the semi-finals progressed to the Final, with the losers playing in the third-place match.

Quarter-finals
The quarter-final schedule was announced after the conclusion of the final-day regular season matches.

(1) Belfast Giants vs. (8) Coventry Blaze

(2) Sheffield Steelers vs. (7) Dundee Stars

(3) Cardiff Devils vs. (6) Glasgow Clan

(4) Nottingham Panthers vs. (5) Guildford Flames

Semi-finals
The schedule for the Playoff Finals weekend was announced after the conclusion of the quarter-final matches.

Third-place match

Final

References

External links

Elite Ice Hockey League seasons
2021–22 in British ice hockey
United